The 19th Wife is a 2010 American drama television film directed by Rod Holcomb and written by Richard Friedenberg, based on David Ebershoff's 2008 novel of the same name. It aired on Lifetime on September 13, 2010.

Plot
Amidst a Southern Utah Fundamentalist Church of Jesus Christ of Latter-Day Saints community, BeckyLyn (Wettig) is accused of murdering her polygamist husband. A fellow wife, Queenie (Leigh) is convinced of her friend's innocence and with BeckyLyn's son, Jordan (Czuchry) they work to clear his mother's name.

Cast
 Chyler Leigh as Queenie
 Matt Czuchry as Jordan
 Patricia Wettig as BeckyLyn
 Jeff Hephner as Hiram
 John Bourgeois as Brigham Young

Reception
The Huffington Post praised the "impressive" cast for bringing "life and credence to this fascinating story of murder and faith". The review continued: "It is fascinating to watch from beginning to end not just because of the "whodunit" factor but also because of the religious implications. Plus the cast strikes just the right tone of intensity and natural charm."

Monsters and Critics described it posively as a "sweeping epic" that is both "compelling" and "thought-provoking."

Ebsershoff, the author of the original novel, was not satisfied with the film over significant plot changes the producers made. Most significantly of these was to exclude Jordan's homosexuality, as presented in the novel, and present him as a heterosexual character.

Ebsershoff explained his disapproval in an interview:I had no role in the adaptation. A few weeks before filming began I learned that Jordan had been rewritten as straight. I was told that this was a network decision. Obviously I was offended, disappointed, and baffled. I hope that the movie sends people to the book so that they can meet my Jordan, along with his boyfriend, Tom, and their dogs, Elektra and Joey.

See also
The Danish Girl (film)

References

External links
 
Official website

2010 television films
2010 films
2010 drama films
2010s American films
2010s English-language films
American drama television films
Cultural depictions of Brigham Young
Films about Mormonism
Films about polygamy
Films based on American novels
Films directed by Rod Holcomb
Films scored by Steve Porcaro
Films set in Utah
Films shot in Calgary
Lifetime (TV network) films
Television films based on books
Works about polygamy in Mormonism